HMS Zulu (F124) was a  of the Royal Navy in service from 1964 to 1984. Zulu was built by Alexander Stephen and Sons, of Govan. She was launched on 3 July 1962 and commissioned on 17 April 1964.

She was sold to the Indonesian Navy in 1984 and renamed KRI Martha Khristina Tiyahahu (331).

Design and construction
The Tribal-, or Type 81-class, frigates were developed in the mid-1950s as a General Purpose frigate, capable of use in both anti-submarine and anti-aircraft duties in a full-scale war, while serving for Cold War policing duties in peace-time, in particular to replace the old s serving in the Persian Gulf.

Displacement was  standard and  full load. Propulsion was by a single-shaft Combined steam and gas (COSAG) arrangement, effectively half of the powerplant of the s.

The ships were fitted with two QF 4.5-in (113 mm) Mark 5 guns, salvaged from scrapped Second World War destroyers, mounted fore and aft. Anti-aircraft armament consisted of two Seacat anti-aircraft missile launchers with a GWS 21 director. For anti-submarine and anti-ship duties, a hangar and flight deck for a single Westland Wasp helicopter was fitted, while a Limbo anti-submarine mortar provided close-in anti-submarine armament.  Mohawk was fitted with a large Type 965 long range air search radar on a lattice foremast, with a Type 993 short range air/surface target indicating radar and Type 978 navigation radar also fitted. An MRS3 fire control system was carried to direct the 4.5-inch guns. The ship had a sonar suite of Type 177 medium range search sonar, Type 162 bottom search and Type 170 attack sonar. The ship had a crew of 253 officers and other ranks. Two 20mm Oerlikon cannon were later fitted for use against small boats during low intensity patrol and policing duties.

Zulu was laid down at Alexander Stephen and Sons, Govan, Glasgow shipyard on 13 December 1960. She was launched on 3 July 1962 and commissioned on 17 April 1964. The ship's cost was £5,100,000. Zulu was the only Tribal completed with Seacat missiles; her six sister frigates were built with two 40 mm Bofors guns and fitted with the Seacat system during later refits.

Royal Navy Service

After commissioning and workup, Zulu joined the 9th Frigate Squadron, operating east of Suez. On 1 July 1965, Zulu went to the assistance of survivors from the Greek merchant ship , who had abandoned ship and came ashore on Abd al Kuri island, South Yemen. On 16 August 1965, Zulu returned to the UK for refit, which was completed at Rosyth in January 1966. In 1966, Zulu contributed to the Beira Patrol off the coast of East Africa, assisting in the enforcement of an oil blockade on Rhodesia. She was on patrol for over 120 days in 1967, intercepting four ships suspected of carrying oil for Rhodesia.

From January to October 1967 Zulu was commanded by the future Admiral of the Fleet William Staveley. Zulu and the frigate , together with the civilian tenders Atherfield and Culver, helped to fight the fire aboard the stricken tanker.

In 1972, a United States Navy P-3 Orion aircraft crashed on a mountain in northern Morocco with the loss of 14 crew. Zulu'''s Westland Wasp helicopter was sent to the wreckage site, where five bodies were found. In 1974, Zulu deployed to the West Indies. When Guatemala threatened to annex Belize in 1975, Zulu steamed to the area from an American port to augment British forces. Such was the urgency that Zulu left 20 sailors behind.

In 1977, Zulu was presented at the Spithead Fleet Review, held in honour of Queen Elizabeth's Silver Jubilee. At this time she was part of the 4th Frigate Squadron. Later that year, Zulu formed part of the eight-ship Group 6 deployment, led by the cruiser , on naval exercises in the Far East.

Manpower shortages in the Royal Navy necessitated Zulu being reduced to reserve in 1979, as part of the Standby Squadron. She was placed on the disposal list in 1981. During the Falklands War, Zulu was taken out of reserve and prepared for active service, recommissioning on 9 August. She operated in home waters and as the West Indies Guard Ship.

In November 1983 Zulu became the Gibraltar Guardship. Before decommissioning on 30 March 1984, Zulu, as the last ship in commission with more than one gun turret, fired the Royal Navy's last "full" broadside.

Indonesian Navy Service

Indonesia bought Zulu on 16 April 1984, renaming the frigate KRI Martha Khristina Tiyahahu'', in honour of Martha Christina Tiahahu, who fought against Dutch colonial forces. After refit at Vosper Thornycroft's Woolston yard, the ship commissioned into the Indonesian Navy on 2 May 1985. The frigate was struck from the Indonesian Naval Vessel Register in 2000.

References

Publications
 

 

 
 
 
 
 
 

Tribal-class frigates
Ships built in Govan
1962 ships
Khristina Tiyahahu-class frigates